The 68th New York State Legislature, consisting of the New York State Senate and the New York State Assembly, met from January 7 to May 14, 1845, during the first year of Silas Wright's governorship, in Albany.

Background
Under the provisions of the New York Constitution of 1821, 32 Senators were elected on general tickets in eight senatorial districts for four-year terms. They were divided into four classes, and every year eight Senate seats came up for election. Assemblymen were elected countywide on general tickets to a one-year term, the whole Assembly being renewed annually.

On May 6, 1844, the Legislature enacted to reduce the number of canal commissioners from 6 to 4, and that the canal commissioners be elected statewide by popular ballot.

U.S. Senator Nathaniel P. Tallmadge (W) resigned his seat on June 17, 1844, to take office as Governor of the Wisconsin Territory. U.S. Senator Silas Wright (D) was elected Governor of New York, and resigned his seat on November 26, 1844. On November 30, Gov. William C. Bouck appointed Lt. Gov. Daniel S. Dickinson (D) and State Senator Henry A. Foster (D) to fill the two vacancies temporarily.

At this time there were two major political parties: the Democratic Party and the Whig Party. The Democratic Party was split into two factions: the "Barnburners" and the "Hunkers." The radical abolitionists appeared as the Liberty Party. In the First District, the American Republican Party nominated tickets for the Senate and Assembly. About this time the Anti-Rent War began, and the Anti-Renters cross-endorsed Whigs or Democrats, according to their opinion on the rent issue.

The Democratic state convention met on September 4 at Syracuse, and nominated U.S. Senator Silas Wright for governor, Addison Gardiner for lieutenant governor, and an electoral ticket pledged to James K. Polk.

The Whig state convention met on September 11 at Syracuse, and nominated Millard Fillmore for governor, Samuel J. Wilkin for lieutenant governor, and an electoral ticket pledged to Henry Clay.

Elections
The New York state election, 1844 was held on November 5. Silas Wright and Addison Gardiner were elected governor and lieutenant governor, and four Democrats were elected canal commissioners. Also the Democratic electoral ticket won, and New York's 36 votes were cast for James K. Polk and George M. Dallas.

State Senator Robert Denniston (2nd D.) was re-elected. George Folsom (1st D.), John P. Beekman (3rd D.), Augustus C. Hand (4th D.), Enoch B. Talcott (5th D.), George D. Beers (6th D.), Henry J. Sedgwick (7th D.) and Carlos Emmons (8th D.) were also elected to the Senate. Folsom was an American Republican, Emmons was a Whig, the other six were Democrats.

Sessions
On January 6, the Democratic assemblymen met in caucus and nominated Horatio Seymour (Hunker) for Speaker with 35 votes against 30 for William C. Crain (Barnburner).

The Legislature met for the regular session at the Old State Capitol in Albany on January 7, 1845; and adjourned on May 14.

Horatio Seymour (D) was elected Speaker.

On January 18, the Legislature elected John A. Dix (Barnb.) to succeed Henry A. Foster (Hunk.) as U.S. Senator, to fill the vacancy caused by the resignation of Silas Wright; and Daniel S. Dickinson (Hunker) to succeed himself, to fill the vacancy caused by the resignation of U.S. Senator Nathaniel P. Tallmadge.

On February 3, the Legislature re-elected State Comptroller Azariah C. Flagg (D); and elected Nathaniel S. Benton (Hunker) to succeed Samuel Young (Barnb.) as Secretary of State; Benjamin Enos (Hunker) to succeed Thomas Farrington (Barnb.) as State Treasurer; John Van Buren (Barnb.) to succeed George P. Barker (D) as Attorney General; and Hugh Halsey (Barnb.) to succeed Nathaniel Jones (D) as Surveyor General.

On February 4, the Legislature re-elected U.S. Senator Daniel S. Dickinson (Hunker) to a six-year term beginning on March 4, 1845.

On May 13, an "Act recommending a Convention of the people of this State" was passed, calling for a convention to amend the State Constitution. This bill had been debated throughout the whole session, and was finally approved by the votes of the Barnburners, Whigs and American Republicans, against fierce opposition of the Hunkers.

State Senate

Districts
 The First District (4 seats) consisted of Kings, New York and Richmond counties.
 The Second District (4 seats) consisted of Dutchess, Orange, Putnam, Queens, Rockland, Suffolk, Sullivan, Ulster and Westchester counties.
 The Third District (4 seats) consisted of Albany, Columbia, Delaware, Greene, Rensselaer, Schenectady and Schoharie counties.
 The Fourth District (4 seats) consisted of Clinton, Essex, Franklin, Fulton, Hamilton, Herkimer, Montgomery, St. Lawrence, Saratoga, Warren and Washington counties.
 The Fifth District (4 seats) consisted of Jefferson, Lewis, Madison, Oneida, Oswego and Otsego counties.
 The Sixth District (4 seats) consisted of Allegany, Broome, Cattaraugus, Chemung, Chenango, Livingston, Steuben, Tioga and Tompkins counties.
 The Seventh District (4 seats) consisted of Cayuga, Cortland, Onondaga, Ontario, Seneca, Wayne and Yates counties.
 The Eighth District (4 seats) consisted of Chautauqua, Erie, Genesee, Monroe, Niagara, Orleans and Wyoming counties.

Note: There are now 62 counties in the State of New York. The counties which are not mentioned in this list had not yet been established, or sufficiently organized, the area being included in one or more of the abovementioned counties.

Members
The asterisk (*) denotes members of the previous Legislature who continued in office as members of this Legislature.

Employees
 Clerk: Isaac R. Elwood
 Deputy Clerk: Hiram Leonard
 Sergeant-at-Arms: Charles Niven, until February 1
Charles Bryan, from February 1
 Doorkeeper: Jared S. Halsey
 Assistant Doorkeeper: Martin Miller
 Janitor: Burgess Wands
 Messengers: John H. Finigan, Joseph Courtney Jr.

State Assembly

Districts

 Albany County (3 seats)
 Allegany County (2 seats)
 Broome County (1 seat)
 Cattaraugus County (2 seats)
 Cayuga County (3 seats)
 Chautauqua County (3 seats)
 Chemung County (1 seat)
 Chenango County (3 seats)
 Clinton County (1 seat)
 Columbia County (3 seats)
 Cortland County (2 seats)
 Delaware County (2 seats)
 Dutchess County (3 seats)
 Erie County (3 seats)
 Essex County (1 seat)
 Franklin County (1 seat)
 Fulton and Hamilton counties (1 seat)
 Genesee County (2 seats)
 Greene County (2 seats)
 Herkimer County (2 seats)
 Jefferson County (3 seats)
 Kings County (2 seats)
 Lewis County (1 seat)
 Livingston County (2 seats)
 Madison County (3 seats)
 Monroe County (3 seats)
 Montgomery County (2 seats)
 The City and County of New York (13 seats)
 Niagara County (2 seats)
 Oneida County (4 seats)
 Onondaga County (4 seats)
 Ontario County (3 seats)
 Orange County (3 seats)
 Orleans County (1 seat)
 Oswego County (2 seats)
 Otsego County (3 seats)
 Putnam County (1 seat)
 Queens County (1 seat)
 Rensselaer County (3 seats)
 Richmond County (1 seat)
 Rockland County (1 seat)
 St. Lawrence County (2 seats)
 Saratoga County (2 seats)
 Schenectady County (1 seat)
 Schoharie County (2 seats)
 Seneca County (1 seat)
 Steuben County (3 seats)
 Suffolk County (2 seats)
 Sullivan County (1 seat)
 Tioga County (1 seat)
 Tompkins County (2 seats)
 Ulster County (2 seats)
 Warren County (1 seat)
 Washington (2 seats)
 Wayne County (2 seats)
 Westchester County (2 seats)
 Wyoming County (2 seats)
 Yates County (1 seat)

Note: There are now 62 counties in the State of New York. The counties which are not mentioned in this list had not yet been established, or sufficiently organized, the area being included in one or more of the abovementioned counties.

Assemblymen
The asterisk (*) denotes members of the previous Legislature who continued as members of this Legislature.

Party affiliations follow the statement given by the Schenectady Cabinet.

Employees
 Clerk: James R. Rose
 Sergeant-at-Arms: David B. Grout
 Doorkeeper: Elbridge B. Fenn
 Assistant Doorkeeper: Israel B. Neahr
 Second Assistant Doorkeeper: Isaac C. Sheldon

Notes

Sources
 The New York Civil List compiled by Franklin Benjamin Hough (Weed, Parsons and Co., 1858) [pg. 109 and 441 for Senate districts; pg. 134f for senators; pg. 148f for Assembly districts; pg. 230f for assemblymen; pg. 322 and 330 for presidential election]
 Political History of the State of New York from January 1, 1841, to January 1, 1847, Vol III, including the Life of Silas Wright (Hall & Dickson, Syracuse NY, 1848; pg. 503 to 570)
 Journal of the Senate (68th Session) (1845)
 The Anti-Rent Era in New York Law and Politics 1839 to 1865 by Charles W. McCurdy (The University of South Carolina Press, 2001; pg. 162 and 362)

068
1845 in New York (state)
1845 U.S. legislative sessions